Gurrey is a surname. Notable people with the surname include:

Alfred Richard Gurrey Sr. (1852–1944), English-born American painter 
Caitlin Gurrey (born 1995), New Zealand cricketer
Caroline Haskins Gurrey (1875–1927), American photographer

See also
Gurley (surname)
Gurney (surname)